Hnevank (meaning "Old Monastery") is a 7th-12th century Armenian Apostolic Church monastery, located near the village of Kurtan in the Lori Province of Armenia. The monastery is situated on a hill within a gorge, near where the Dzoraget and Gargar rivers join.

The monastery was entirely rebuilt by lord Smbat of the House of Orbelian, a branch of the Liparitids who were expelled to Armenia in the late 12th century from Georgia. Liparitids were themselves a branch of the Mamikonians. Smbat was the ancestor of the Armenian princes of Syunik. A Georgian inscription around the drum attests his name. 

The monastery has a gavit and various service buildings scattered around the site. 

The government of Armenia has recently begun renovating the monastery. The collapsed dome of the main church has been restored entirely.

Gallery

External links 
 Armeniapedia.org: Hnevank

Christian monasteries in Armenia
Tourist attractions in Lori Province
Christian monasteries established in the 7th century
Oriental Orthodox congregations established in the 7th century
Buildings and structures in Lori Province
7th-century churches in Armenia